The 2006 South Lakeland District Council election took place on 4 May 2006 to elect members of South Lakeland District Council in Cumbria, England. One third of the council was up for election and the Liberal Democrats gained overall control of the council from no overall control.

After the election, the composition of the council was:
Liberal Democrat 31
Conservative 18
Labour 2
Independent 1

Background
Candidates in the election included a Save Westmorland Hospital Group, opposed to any reduced services at Westmorland General Hospital. Meanwhile, councillors who stood down at the election included cabinet member Bob Barker and long time independent Elizabeth Braithwaite.

Election result
The results saw the Liberal Democrats win a majority on the council after gaining 9 seats, 6 from Labour, 2 from the Conservatives and 1 from an independent. This gave the Liberal Democrats 31 seats and was the first time that a political party had won a majority on the council. The 6 Liberal Democrat gains from Labour were all in Kendal, as well as 1 of the 2 gains from the Conservatives. The other 2 seats they gained were Sedbergh from the Conservatives and Lakes Grasmere, where the independent councillor had stepped down at the election.

Ward results

Paul Little was a sitting councillor for the Kendal Highgate ward.

Gwendoline Murfin was a sitting councillor for the Kendal Oxenholme ward.

Charles Batteson was originally elected as a Labour councillor.

References

2006
2006 English local elections
2000s in Cumbria